FK Kauno Žalgiris is futsal club from Kaunas, Lithuania. The club has been dominating Lithuanian Futsal A Lyga and the Lithuanian Futsal Cup in the recent years. The club is a regular to the main round of the UEFA Futsal Champions League, reaching the #9 in the top European club ranking at the end of 2020-21 season. The club was known as FK Vytis futsal before an acquisition by basketball and football club Kauno Žalgiris in 2021.

History

FK Vytis 
FK Vytis futsal was founded in 2013. The club's predecessor history is intertwined with two other Kaunas teams Atletas and Inkaras, whose football, futsal and beach football teams merged, split, fell apart and got re-established. Vytis got stronger within next three years, and won their first domestic league and cup double in 2016–2017 season. The club became the dominant force in Lithuanian futsal, winning 6 league titles in a row, including 5 league and cup doubles.

FK Kaunas Žalgiris 

In October 2020 Kaunas sports organisation Žalgiris announced that FK Vytis will join its structure, which already include BC Žalgiris basketball, FK Kauno Žalgiris football clubs as well as respective youth academies. Kauno Žalgiris club aimed to create a complete "football pyramid", and did not yet have a futsal team. 2021 February 26 the club officially changed its name, until then it was prevented by the requirement of the UEFA Futsal Champions League for clubs not to change names while a season is ongoing.

In 2021 the club signed a number of Brazilians, including team manager Dentinho, who was also offered to simultaneously manage Lithuania national futsal team. In 2022 the club signed Ricardo, a son of famous footballer Cacau.

UEFA Futsal Champions League 

Vytis started participating in the UEFA Futsal Champions League, and reached the elite round in its second season in European competitions. Vytis was hoping for even better results next season, having signed 6 players from Brazil in 2019. It was not to be, and the Brazilians, including a coach, left at the end of the season. Despite this, Vytis/Kauno Žalgiris has played 5 times in a row in the main round of the UEFA Futsal Champions League. The club reached the best of 16 in the 2020-21 season, and was ranking #9 in the top European club ranking.

Achievements 
Futsal A Lyga:
Winners (6): 2016–17, 2017–18, 2018–19, 2019–20, 2020–21, 2021–22 
LFF Futsal Cup :
Winners (5): 2016–17, 2017–18, 2018–19, 2019–20, 2020–21

Managers

Squad

References

External links
 Kauno Žalgiris futsal on Facebook
 YouTube channel
 Kauno Žalgiris futsal on UEFA portal
 Kauno Žalgiris on LFF portal

Futsal clubs in Lithuania
Sport in Kaunas